Chiara Costa (born 29 May 1975) is an Italian-born naturalized Senegalese sports shooter. She competed in the women's skeet event at the 2020 Summer Olympics.

She resides in Rome and also works as a teacher and journalist.

References

External links

1975 births
Living people
Sportspeople from Rome
Italian female sport shooters
Naturalized citizens of Senegal
Senegalese female sport shooters
Olympic shooters of Senegal
Shooters at the 2020 Summer Olympics
Senegalese people of Italian descent